In 2011, the Campeonato Brasileiro Série D, the fourth division of the Brazilian League, will be contested for the third time in history, during 18 July and 13 November. It will be contested by 40 clubs, four of which will eventually qualify to the Campeonato Brasileiro Série C to be contested in 2012.

Competition format
The 40 teams are divided in eight groups of 5, playing within them in a double round-robin format. The two best ranked in each group at the end of 10 rounds will qualify to the Second Stage, which will be played in home-and-away system. Winners advance to Third Stage. The quarterfinal winners will be promoted to the Série C 2012. As there is no Série E, or fifth division, technically there will be no relegation. However, teams who were not promoted will have to re-qualify for Série D 2012 through their respective state leagues.The competition can also be considered as 4 mini-tournaments (Group 1+2;3+4;5+6;7+8) because according to the playoff-structure, exactly one team of each "mini-tournament" will be promoted.

Participating teams

Notes: Amazonas:After Amazonas got an additional berth (see Note RO) Amazonas FA decided that the best placed team in CBF's ranking (Nacional) is qualified.Fast Clube (2010 Campeonato Amazonense runners) appealed to the Amazonas Court of Sporting Justice (TJD), and on 7 July 2011, it was announced that Fast Clube's appeal was rejected.On 12 July the Court of the State of Amazonas granted an injunction in favor of the fan Cavalcante Marco Tulio Costa, as a fan against the FAF and CBF. In the injunction, the FAF is obliged to indicate the Fast Club as the second representative of the Amazonas in the Brazilian Championship Série D.On 14 July the injunction was revoked.
 Goiás: All eligible teams from 2011 Campeonato Goiano 1ª Divisão (CRAC, Aparecidense, Goianésia, Morrinhos) withdrew and 2011 Campeonato Goiano 2ª Divisão season start in June. So the best placed non-2011 1ª Divisão team in 2010 Campeonato Goiano is qualified.

 Minas Gerais: 
Best placed team América de Teófilo Otoni (4th) withdrew.
   Rio de Janeiro: The five best teams (Boavista, Olaria, Resende, Americano and Nova Iguaçu) withdrew.

   Rondônia  and  Roraima: All Rondônia and all Roraima-based teams withdrew. Since Rondônia and Roraima were already allocated in Group 1, the entries passed on to Amazonas and Mato Grosso best and second best placed on CBF's Ranking.

 Tocantins: Best placed team Gurupi (1st) withdrew.

First stage

Group 1 (AC-AM-MT)

Group 2 (AP-MA-PA-PI)

Group 3 (CE-PE-RN)

Group 4 (AL-BA-PB-SE)

Group 5 (DF-GO-MG-TO)

Group 6 (DF-ES-MG-RJ)

Group 7 (MS-PR-RS-SP)

Group 8 (PR-RS-SC)

Final stage

References

Campeonato Brasileiro Série D seasons
4